Olev Tinn (born on 3 September 1920 Haradok, Belarus – 6 September 1971 Tallinn) was an Estonian actor.

Tinn's father was Estonian actor and theatre director Eduard Tinn. In 1950 he graduated from Estonian State Theatre Institute. 1940-1941 he worked at Ugala Theatre, and 1944–1971 at Estonian Drama Theatre.

In 1962, he was awarded Meritorious Artist of the Estonian Soviet Socialist Republic. He died in 1971 and is buried in Tallinn's Forest Cemetery.

Selected filmography

 1951 Valgus Koordis (feature film; role: Taaksalu)
 1957 Tagahoovis (feature film; role: Murkin) 
 1958 Esimese järgu kapten (feature film; role: ?) 
 1959 Veealused karid (feature film; role: Värdi)
 1961 Juhuslik kohtumine (feature film; role: ?)
 1964 Põrgupõhja uus Vanapagan (feature film; role: fat host)
 1964 Lõoke (feature film; role: Military commander)
 1966 Mis juhtus Andres Lapeteusega? (feature film; role: party guest)

References

1920 births
1971 deaths
Estonian male stage actors
Estonian male film actors
Estonian male radio actors
20th-century Estonian male actors
People from Haradok
Burials at Metsakalmistu
Soviet male actors